The 1985 BC Lions season was the 28th season for the team in the Canadian Football League (CFL) and their 32nd overall. The Lions finished in first place in the West Division with a 13–3 record and won the Grey Cup by defeating the Hamilton Tiger-Cats 37–24 in the 73rd Grey Cup game. The win captured the second championship in franchise history and also ended the longest Grey Cup drought for the Lions at 21 years.

Offseason

CFL Draft

Preseason

Regular season

Season standings

Season schedule

Awards and records
 CFL's Most Outstanding Player Award – Mervyn Fernandez (WR)
 CFL's Most Outstanding Rookie Award – Mike Gray (DT)
 CFLPA's Most Outstanding Community Service Award – Tyrone Crews (LB)
 CFL's Coach of the Year – Don Matthews
 Jeff Nicklin Memorial Trophy – Mervyn Fernandez (WR)

1985 CFL All-Stars
 RB – Keyvan Jenkins, CFL All-Star
 WR – Mervyn Fernandez, CFL All-Star
 OT – John Blain, CFL All-Star
 DT – Mike Gray, CFL All-Star
 DE – James "Quick" Parker, CFL All-Star
 LB – Kevin Konar, CFL All-Star
 DB – Darnell Clash, CFL All-Star

Playoffs

West Final

Grey Cup

First Quarter

BC – TD Armour 84 yard pass from Dewalt (Passaglia convert)
BC – FG Passaglia

Second Quarter

BC – FG Passaglia
HAM – TD Ingram 35 yard pass from Hobart (Ruoff convert)
HAM – TD Shepherd 00 yard pass from Hobart (Ruoff convert)
BC – TD Armour 59 yard pass from Dewalt (Passaglia convert)
BC – FG Passaglia

Third Quarter
BC – FG Passaglia
BC – FG Passaglia

Fourth Quarter

HAM – FG Ruoff
BC – Single Passaglia
BC – TD Sandusky 66 yard pass from Dewalt (Passaglia convert)
HAM – TD Stapler 35 yard pass from Hobart (Ruoff convert)

References

BC Lions seasons
N. J. Taylor Trophy championship seasons
Grey Cup championship seasons
1985 Canadian Football League season by team
1985 in British Columbia